Rubén Ariel Olivera da Rosa (born 4 May 1983 in Montevideo) is a Uruguayan former footballer who played as a midfielder, currently in charge as head coach of Serie D club Racing Aprilia.

A versatile player, he is capable of playing anywhere in midfield and throughout his career he has been deployed as a left or right winger, as a central midfielder, as an attacking midfielder, and even as a forward.

Playing career
Olivera began his career in Danubio, in 2001, and was later signed by Juventus F.C. in 2002. He made his Serie A debut in 2–1 win to A.S. Roma, on 19 April 2003, as Juventus won the title that season, under manager Marcello Lippi.

He was loaned to Atlético Madrid during the second half of the 2003–04 season, after he did not make any appearances for the club. He returned from his loan in 2004, but was also used scarcely under manager Fabio Capello, in particular during the 2005–06 season. In 2007, while playing for Sampdoria on loan, he was banned for 5 matches for punching an opponent in the ribs, and also for kicking him in the groin.

Following his time on loan with Sampdoria, Olivera returned to Juventus in 2007, although he was loaned out again to Urugyan side Peñarol in 2008. In 2008, he signed permanently with Genoa on a year contract. For the 2009–10 season, he went back to Uruguay on loan with Peñarol. On 1 July 2010, he returned to Italy, signing a 3-year contract with Lecce.

In 2012, he was signed by Fiorentina, and he remained at the club for a season and a half.

On 30 January 2014, Olivera joined Serie B side Brescia on an 18-month deal.

In January 2015 he moved to Latina. He played 3 games and scored a goal for the team before an injury put an end to his season in April 2015. In 2015-16 he scored 5 goals in 33 appearances in Serie B. Olivera then joined Liga de Quito on 1 January 2017. However, he returned to Latina in Italy in September 2017 who now was playing in Serie D. In February 2018, he was also appointed technical director of Latina. He left Latina in the summer 2018 and said to the medias, that his career was over. However, his former Latina teammate, Daniele Corvia, convinced him to join fellow league club, Aprilia Racing, which he also did on 16 July 2018.

In December 2019, 36-year old Olivera joined Ostiamare. He moved back to Aprilia in June 2020, but announced his retirement in May 2021 after being diagnosed with a heart condition.

International career
Olivera made 18 appearances for Uruguay between 2001 and 2005, and he represented his country at the 2001 Copa América under manager Daniel Passarella, as Uruguay were eliminated in the semi-finals, finishing the tournament in fourth place.

Coaching career
On 3 June 2022, Racing Aprilia announced to have hired Olivera as their new head coach.

Honours

Juventus
Serie A (1): 2002–03
Italian Super Cup (1): 2003

References

External links

Ruben Olivera profile with statistics and timeline
Ruben Olivera profile – myjuve.it

1983 births
Living people
Footballers from Montevideo
Uruguayan footballers
Uruguayan football managers
Uruguay international footballers
Uruguayan expatriate footballers
Danubio F.C. players
Peñarol players
Juventus F.C. players
Atlético Madrid footballers
U.C. Sampdoria players
Genoa C.F.C. players
U.S. Lecce players
ACF Fiorentina players
Brescia Calcio players
Latina Calcio 1932 players
A.S. Ostia Mare Lido Calcio players
F.C. Aprilia Racing Club players
L.D.U. Quito footballers
Serie A players
Serie B players
Serie D players
Ecuadorian Serie A players
La Liga players
Uruguayan Primera División players
2001 Copa América players
Association football midfielders
Expatriate footballers in Italy
Expatriate footballers in Spain
Expatriate footballers in Ecuador
Uruguayan expatriate sportspeople in Italy
Uruguayan expatriate sportspeople in Spain
Uruguayan expatriate sportspeople in Ecuador